Quin is a shortened form of the Irish surname and male given name Quinlan. 

Notable people with the name include:

Surname 
 Andy Quin (born 1960), composer and jazz pianist
 Ann Quin (1936–1973), British writer
 Barry Quin (21st century), British-born actor
 Betty Quin (21st century), Australian script writer
 Edward Quin (journalist) (died 1823), Irish journalist
 Edward Quin (cartographer) (1794–1828), his son, cartographer
 Edward Quin (pastoralist) (died 1922), New South Wales politician
 Edwin Wyndham-Quin, 3rd Earl of Dunraven and Mount-Earl (1812–1871), 1st Baron Kenry, politician
 Frederic Hervey Foster Quin (1799–1878), the first homeopathic physician in England
 Huston Quin (1876–1938), mayor of Louisville, Kentucky
 James Quin (1693–1766), English actor
 Jesse Quin (born 1981), English musician
 Joyce Quin, Baroness Quin (born 1944), Labour Party politician in the United Kingdom
 Liza Quin (born 1982), Cuban-American artist
 Mary Quin, American businesswoman
 Michael Joseph Quin (1796–1843), Irish author, journalist and editor
 Percy Quin (1872–1932), American politician
 Rebecca Quin (born 1987), Irish professional wrestler currently signed to WWE under the ring name Becky Lynch
 Sara Quin (born 1980), Canadian musician
 Tegan Quin (born 1980), Canadian musician
 Valentine Quin, 1st Earl of Dunraven and Mount-Earl (1752–1824), Earl in the Peerage of Ireland
 Vanessa Quin, world champion BMX and downhill rider from New Zealand
 Walter Quin (1575?–1634?), poet and royal tutor of Charles I of England
 William Quin (c. 1836–1880), plasterer and politician in South Australia
 Windham Quin, 2nd Earl of Dunraven and Mount-Earl (1782–1850), member of the United Kingdom Parliament

Given name 
 Quin Blanding (born 1996), American football player
 Quin Epperly (1913–2001), American racing car constructor
 Quin Hillyer (born 1964), American newspaper columnist and writer
 Quin Houff (born 1997), American professional racing driver
 Quin Ivy (born 1937), American former disc jockey
 Quin Kruijsen (born 1990), Dutch footballer
 Quin Monson (born 1969), American associate professor of social science at Brigham Young University
 Quin Snyder (born 1966), American basketball coach

Fictional characters 
 Dugall Quin, a character in the folk ballad Dugall Quin
 Mr. Quin, a character in the short story collection The Mysterious Mr. Quin

See also
 Qin (surname)
 Quinn (disambiguation)
 Quinn (given name)
 Quinn (surname)